Berthella plumula, commonly known as yellow-plumed sea slug, is a gastropod mollusc usually found on rocky coasts in the infralittoral zone and which can live up to 30m depth.

Description 
The head is flat and a large oral veil lies between the propodium and the mantle. The rhinophores are protruding and enrolled. The species has acid glands in the skin which secrete sulphuric acid for protection in case of danger.

Distribution 
Berthella plumula is found in the north-eastern Atlantic, the Mediterranean Sea, the English Channel and the North Sea.

Behavior

Diet 
Berthella plumula is a slow moving predator which scrapes its radula on rocks to feed on colonial ascidians of the genus Botryllus as well as on Oscarella sponges.

Reproduction 
The species is hermaphrodite and the two individuals reciprocally fecundate each other by exchanging their sperm. The reproductive period occurs in spring. The laying is tube-shaped and the eggs are displayed in spiral.

Similar species 
Berthella plumula can be confused with Berthella stellata, which is smaller and displays a small white mark on its back, and with Berthellina edwardsii, which is usually bigger and more red.

References 

Pleurobranchidae
Molluscs of the Atlantic Ocean
Molluscs of the Mediterranean Sea
Gastropods described in 1803
Taxa named by George Montagu (naturalist)